South Sudanese cuisine is based on grains (maize, sorghum). It uses yams, potatoes, vegetables, legumes (beans, lentil, peanuts), meat (goat, mutton, chicken and fish near the rivers and lakes), okra and fruit as well. Meat is boiled, grilled or dried.

South Sudanese cuisine was influenced by Arab cuisine.

Examples of South Sudanese dishes 

 Kisra, sorghum pancake, national dish
 Mandazi, fried pastry
 Wala-wala, millet porridge
 Aseeda, sorghum porridge
 Gurassa, yeasted pancake
 Kajaik, fish stew
 Ful sudani, peanut sweet
 Tamia, falafel
 Ful medames
 Combo, dish from spinach, peanut butter and tomatoes
 Goat meat soup
 Molokhia

South Sudanese drinks 

 Coffee
 Karkade
 Southern Sudan Beverages Limited, the only brewery in South Sudan, went bankrupt in 2016. It made three types of beer, like White Bull Lager.''

References 

 
East African cuisine